Adam Joseph Boyes (born 1 November 1990) is an English semi-professional footballer who plays as a striker for Marske United. Boyes was the top scorer in the 2021/22 FA Cup, with a tally of 11 goals 

He started his career with the York City youth system, before making his first-team debut in 2008. Following a trial with Manchester United, Boyes signed a professional contract at York and he scored his first goal against Kidderminster Harriers. After playing in the Final of the FA Trophy at Wembley Stadium, he joined Scunthorpe United in 2009. He had loans with former club York and Kidderminster Harriers during the 2009–10 season. After being released by Scunthorpe in 2011 he signed for Boston United.

Club career

York City
Born in Lingdale, North Yorkshire, Boyes played for his local team Lingdale before being spotted by a scout for York City. He went on trial with York and subsequently joined the club's Centre of Excellence in 2005. He signed a two-year scholarship with York in June 2007 and was part of the team that progressed to the third round of the 2007–08 FA Youth Cup. While still a first-year scholar, he made his first-team debut on 16 March 2008 as an 84th minute substitute in a 1–0 defeat to Torquay United in the semi-final second leg of the FA Trophy. After scoring a hat-trick for the reserve team against Barnsley, he made his league debut on 8 April as a substitute during York's 4–0 Conference Premier victory away to Stafford Rangers. Following this appearance, manager Colin Walker said "I thought he looked the part and that can only be good for York City football club". He went on to make two further appearances during the 2007–08 season, which he finished with four appearances. He was handed a one-week trial with Premier League champions Manchester United in May 2008, and after this was extended for a second week he played in a youth tournament that included Hibernian, Middlesbrough, Tottenham Hotspur and a Russian team. During the tournament, he scored for United after intercepting the ball from an attempted header back to goal from an opposition player against Premier Soccer League team Supersport United in a 1–1 draw. Following this, he had "etched out a reputation as one of the game's brightest potential stars".

He started the 2008–09 season "hovering around the fringes of the first team", and after having made four appearances for York during the season he signed a two-year professional contract in November 2008. Boyes scored his first goal for York on 31 January 2009 in the third round of the FA Trophy against Kidderminster Harriers, which gave York the lead, with the match finishing as a 1–1 draw. He scored his first goal in the Conference Premier with a close-range finish from a Richard Brodie assist to help York to a 2–1 home victory over Forest Green Rovers on 21 April. Following this, York manager Martin Foyle praised Boyes, calling him a "future star". In the following match, he scored York's winner on 77 minutes in a 2–1 victory over Weymouth on 24 April, which secured the team's survival from relegation. He started in the 2009 FA Trophy Final at Wembley Stadium on 9 May, which York lost 2–0 to Stevenage Borough, finishing the season with 34 appearances and 3 goals.

Scunthorpe United
Boyes signed for Championship club Scunthorpe United on 10 July 2009 on a three-year contract for an undisclosed six-figure fee. He returned to York on an initial one-month loan on 16 October 2009, making his second debut as an 89th-minute substitute in a 1–1 home draw with Oxford United. He returned to Scunthorpe following the completion of the loan on 17 November, having made four appearances for York. He joined Kidderminster Harriers on loan on 1 March 2010 until the end of the 2009–10 season, making his debut as a 63rd-minute substitute in a 2–2 draw with Ebbsfleet United. He made four appearances for Kidderminster before being recalled by Scunthorpe on 29 March. Boyes made his debut for Scunthorpe on 24 August as an 89th-minute substitute in a 4–2 victory over Sheffield Wednesday in the League Cup second round. He was released by the club after his contract was cancelled by mutual consent on 20 January 2011.

Boston United
Boyes signed for Conference North club Boston United on 28 January 2011 and made his debut in a 2–0 defeat away to Worcester City on 5 February. He missed Boston's match against AFC Telford United on 9 April 2011 after being involved in a car accident earlier in the day. He missed a penalty kick in the penalty shoot-out against Guiseley on 8 May in the play-off semi-final second leg. Boyes was released by Boston at the end of the 2010–11 season after scoring 6 goals in 19 appearances.

Barrow
Following a trial, he signed for Conference Premier club Barrow on 14 July 2011 on a one-year contract.

Gateshead
Boyes signed for Conference Premier club Gateshead on 18 May 2013 on a one-year contract. He made his debut on 10 August against Kidderminster Harriers. He scored his first goal for Gateshead on 12 November against Wrexham at the Racecourse Ground.

Guiseley
Boyes joined Conference North club Guiseley on 23 January 2014 on loan for the remainder of the season. He scored 15 goals in 24 appearances, including scoring in 11 consecutive matches, before signing permanently on 26 May.

Bradford Park Avenue
Boyes signed for National League North club Bradford Park Avenue on 27 May 2017 on a two-year contract.

Spennymoor Town
In 2018, Boyes signed for Spennymoor Town. In August, in the match against FC United of Manchester, he came on to replace Glen Taylor, and scored, making it 2–0 full-time.

Marske United
On 20 June 2020, he transferred to Northern Premier League North-West Division side Marske United, with manager, Carl Jarrett, describing him as "the biggest signing in the clubs history".

During the 2021–22 season, he scored eleven goals in the FA Cup with five coming in one match.  On May 14, he received the FA Golden Ball award from Ian Rush for being the top scorer in the season’s competition before the final at Wembley Stadium.

International career
Boyes was named in the England C team, who represent England at non-League level, in February 2009, for a friendly against the Malta under-21 team, after initially being placed on standby for the match. He entered the match as a second-half substitute as England won 4–0. It was over two years before Boyes made his next England C appearance, which came on 15 November 2011 after starting a 3–1 defeat away to Gibraltar in a friendly. This was followed by a substitute appearance against Italy in a 1–1 draw on 28 February 2012 in the 2011–2013 International Challenge Trophy. He earned three caps for England C from 2009 to 2012.

Style of play
Boyes plays as a striker, although he has also been used as a left winger, and in this position his retention of the ball was "exemplary". He has described himself "as a player who holds the ball up, although I like to work down the channels as well. I see myself as a decent finisher too." He was said to display "a level of awareness that is rare in a 17-year-old".

Personal life
Boyes attended York College one and a half days a week while with York City.

Career statistics

Honours
Guiseley
Conference North play-offs: 2015

Marske United

21/22 FA Cup Golden Ball Winner (Top Scorer) - 11 Goals

References

External links

Profile at the Bradford Park Avenue A.F.C. website

1990 births
Living people
People from Lingdale
Footballers from North Yorkshire
English footballers
England semi-pro international footballers
Association football forwards
York City F.C. players
Scunthorpe United F.C. players
Kidderminster Harriers F.C. players
Boston United F.C. players
Barrow A.F.C. players
Gateshead F.C. players
Guiseley A.F.C. players
Bradford (Park Avenue) A.F.C. players
Spennymoor Town F.C. players
Marske United F.C. players
National League (English football) players
Northern Premier League players